Decatur Hedges House is a historic home located near Hedgesville, Berkeley County, West Virginia. It was built in 1874 and is a two-story, five bay, "L"-shaped brick dwelling.  It measures 38 feet wide by 48 feet deep and sits on a stone foundation. Also on the property is a one-story, gable roofed brick outbuilding.

It was listed on the National Register of Historic Places in 1984.

References

Houses on the National Register of Historic Places in West Virginia
Gothic Revival architecture in West Virginia
Houses completed in 1874
Houses in Berkeley County, West Virginia
National Register of Historic Places in Berkeley County, West Virginia